Gaetano Fontana (born 21 February 1970) is an Italian football manager and former midfielder. He is currently in charge as head coach of  club Turris.

Coaching career
On 18 June 2018 he was unveiled as new head coach of Casertana.

On 22 July 2019, he was hired as head coach of Serie C club Fano. On 2 December 2019, he was dismissed following 8 consecutive losses.

On 26 July 2021 he was appointed head coach of Serie C club Imolese.

On 29 December 2022, Fontana was hired by Serie C struggling club Turris.

Honours and awards
Serie A promotion: 2004 (Fiorentina)
Serie B promotion: 2002 (Ascoli)
Serie B promotion: 2006 (Napoli)

Fontana was a left footed midfielder renowned for his free kicks and leadership qualities. He played into his late 30s while residing mainly in the Italian lower leagues.

References

External links
 ascolicalcio.net
Gaetano Fontana at Soccerway

1970 births
Living people
Italian footballers
U.S. Catanzaro 1929 players
Calcio Padova players
Reggina 1914 players
U.S. Alessandria Calcio 1912 players
S.S. Juve Stabia players
Ascoli Calcio 1898 F.C. players
ACF Fiorentina players
S.S.C. Napoli players
Serie A players
Serie B players
Serie C players
Association football midfielders
People from Catanzaro
Italian football managers
A.S.G. Nocerina managers
S.S. Juve Stabia managers
Cosenza Calcio managers
Alma Juventus Fano 1906 managers
Imolese Calcio 1919 managers
Serie C managers
Footballers from Calabria
Sportspeople from the Province of Catanzaro